Paduka Sri Sultan Ahmad Tajuddin Halim Shah I ibni al-Marhum Sultan Abdullah Mu'adzam Shah (died 15 February 1710) was the 18th Sultan of Kedah. His reign was from 1706 to 1710. He was appointed as Heir Apparent with the title of Raja Muda, after his elder brother, Tunku Muhammad Jiwa had left for Sumatra.

External links
 List of Sultans of Kedah

18th-century Sultans of Kedah
1710 deaths